Brătușeni is a commune in Edineț District, Moldova. It is composed of two villages, Brătușeni and Brătușenii Noi.

Notable people
Anatoliy Kinakh
Ghenadie Ciobanu
Ivan Vakarchuk

References

External links
 Stadionul Bratuseni

Communes of Edineț District